Walton-on-Trent is a civil parish in the South Derbyshire district of Derbyshire, England. The parish contains nine listed buildings that are recorded in the National Heritage List for England.  Of these, two are listed at Grade II*, the middle of the three grades, and the others are at Grade II, the lowest grade.  The parish contains the village of Walton-on-Trent and the surrounding area.  The listed buildings consist of houses, cottages and associated structures, farmhouses and farm buildings, and a church and its lychgate.


Key

Buildings

References

Citations

Sources

 

Lists of listed buildings in Derbyshire